Aleiodes (Greek  "not",  "smooth",  "appearance") is a genus of the family Braconidae of parasitoid wasps described by Constantin Wesmael in 1838. They are also known as mummy-wasps.

The female attacks caterpillars of various species, including many pests such as Gypsy moths and tent caterpillars, and then deposits eggs in the caterpillars. The eggs hatch and the wasp larva feeds on the caterpillar, leaving a hardened caterpillar skin, or mummy. The wasp pupates within the mummy and eventually the adult breaks out, leaving a small hole in the husk of the caterpillar.

There are thousands of species, including:

Aleiodes cacuangoi named after Dolores Cacuango
Aleiodes colberti named after Stephen Colbert
Aleiodes coxalis
Aleiodes dangerlingi named after Dan Gerling
Aleiodes elleni named after Ellen DeGeneres
Aleiodes falloni named after Jimmy Fallon
Aleiodes frosti named after Robert Frost (American poet)
Aleiodes gaga named after Lady Gaga
Aleiodes heterogaster type species of genus
Aleiodes kingmani named after Eduardo KingmanAleiodes shakirae named after Shakira (Colombian singer) Aleiodes stewarti named after Jon Stewart (American comedian)Aleiodes tashimai''

References

Braconidae genera
Biological pest control wasps